The 1978–79 Sheffield Shield season was the 77th season of the Sheffield Shield, the domestic first-class cricket competition of Australia. Victoria won the championship.

Table

Statistics

Most Runs
Andrew Hilditch 778

Most Wickets
David Hourn 40

References

Sheffield Shield
Sheffield Shield
Sheffield Shield seasons